Illyrian dog may refer to:

Illyrian Hound, another name of the Barak hound, a dog breed of the scenthound type
Illyrian Shepherd, an extinct dog breed, predecessor of two modern breeds:
Šarplaninac, a livestock-guardian dog named after the Šar Mountains
Karst Shepherd, a livestock-guardian dog, originating in Slovenia

See also
 Illyrian (disambiguation)

Use of the term Illyrian in modern history